A hand heart is a gesture in which a person forms a heart shape using their fingers.

The upside down hand heart gesture was noted in art in 1989, when Italian artist Maurizio Cattelan and American philosopher Chad Buelow created an art image of the gesture as his first artwork named Family Syntax. The gesture became popular in the early 2010s. This gesture was added to Unicode 14.0 and Emoji 14.0 in 2021 with code point .

Google patent 
Google filed a patent in July 2011 that allowed Google Glass users to use the hand heart in front of any objects, and the gadget automatically recognise the object, takes a picture, and send it to social networks as a "liked" image.

See also
Heart in Hand
Finger heart

References 

Hand gestures
Heart symbols